Serviezel Castle is a pair of ruined castles in the municipality of Valsot of the Canton of Graubünden in Switzerland. Very little is known about either castle and they were probably both built in the 12th century for the Lords of Ramosch.

History
Very little is known about either castle since neither is mentioned in any surviving medieval documents.  Serviezel is probably named after the Wezzels, a local minor nobility family, who are first mentioned around 1150.  They were probably vassals or a cadet line of the lords of Ramosch.  In 1256 the Count of Tyrol granted Nannes of Ramosch permission to build a castle, but that probably refers to the larger and better known Tschanüff Castle.

Castle site

Ramosch
The castle was a single rectangular tower probably with a full or partial ring wall on top of a small hill. The ruins are in poor condition and generally over grown. West of the tower there is a pile of stone which probably marks the location of a collapsed wall or outbuilding.

Tschlin
This tower was built on a large ( hilltop above a trade road through the valley.

Gallery

See also
 List of castles in Switzerland

References

Castles in Graubünden
Ruined castles in Switzerland